Don Carlos is an opera by Giuseppe Verdi, also known as Don Carlo.

Don Carlos or Don Carlo may also refer to:

People

Titled "Don" named "Carlos"
 Don Carlos, Prince of Asturias (1545–1568), heir-apparent to the throne of Spain
 Charles "Don Carlos" Percy (1704–1794), founder of the Percy family of Louisiana, Alabama and Mississippi
 Charles III of Spain or Don Carlos (1716–1788)
 Don Carlos, Count of Molina (1788–1855), son of King Charles IV of Spain and a Carlist claimant to the throne of Spain as Carlos V
 Don Carlos, Duke of Madrid (1848–1909), senior member of the House of Bourbon and a Carlist claimant to the throne of Spain as Carlos VII
 Don Carlos, Prince of Bourbon-Two Sicilies (1870–1949), nephew of the last King of the Two Sicilies, Francis II
 Carlo Gambino or Don Carlo (1902–1976), mafioso and boss of the Gambino crime family

Given name "Don" surname "Carlos"
 Don Carlos (basketball) (born 1944), American basketball player
 Don Carlos (musician) (born 1952), Jamaican reggae singer

Given name "Don Carlos"
 Don Allado or Don Carlos Allado (born 1977), Filipino former basketball player
 Don Carlos Buell (1818–1898), US Army officer
 Don Carlos Harvey (1911–1963), American television and film actor
 Don Carlos Seitz (1862–1935), American newspaper manager
 Don Carlos Smith (1816–1841), brother of Latter Day Saint leader Joseph Smith, Jr.
 Don Carlos Travis Jr. (1911–1996), American professor
 Don Carlos Young (1855–1938), American architect for the Church of Jesus Christ of Latter-day Saints

Fictional characters
 Don Carlos (Miracle Giants Dome-kun), a character from Miracle Giants Dome-kun anime

Other uses
 Don Carlos (play), a historical tragedy by Friedrich Schiller
 Don Carlos, Bukidnon, a Philippine municipality
 MV Don Carlos, a ship

See also

 Carlos I of Portugal (1863–1908), King of Portugal, known as Dom Carlos
 Carlos Arias Navarro (1908–1989), Spanish politician during the reign of Generalissimo Francisco Franco
 Infante Carlos, Duke of Calabria (1938–2015), claimant to the headship of House of Bourbon-Two Sicilies
 Prince Carlos, Duke of Parma (born 1970), current head of the House of Bourbon-Parma and Carlist claimant to the throne of Spain as Carlos Javier I
 Don Carlo Gesualdo (1566–1613), Italian music composer, murderer
 Carlos Hugo, Duke of Parma (1930–2010), head of the House of Bourbon-Parma and Carlist claimant to the throne of Spain as Carlos Hugo I
 Carlos Martínez de Irujo, 1st Marquis of Casa Irujo (1763–1824), Spanish diplomat and public official
 Carlos Miguel Fitz-James Stuart, 14th Duke of Alba (1794–1835), Spanish aristocrat
 Carlos Ometochtzin (died 1539), member of the Acolhua nobility and known for his resistance to Christian evangelization
 
 Don Carlos of Spain (disambiguation)
 Don (disambiguation)
 Carlos (disambiguation)

Carlos, Don